XL Fortran is the name of IBM's proprietary optimizing Fortran compiler for IBM-supported environments, including Linux for little-endian distributions and AIX.

Features
 Tuning for Power ISA
 Fortran language standard support (XL Fortran's Fortran 2008 Compliance Status and  XL Fortran's TS 29113 Compliance Status)
 CUDA Fortran support 
 OpenMP API support 
 Five optimization levels (-O0,-O2,-O3,-O4,-O5) 
 Profile-directed feedback optimization
 Interprocedural optimization and inlining
 High order transformations

References

External links
 IBM Fortran Compilers family introduction
 Product documentation: XL Fortran for Linux, V16.1.1
 Product documentation: XL Fortran for AIX, V16.1.0
 Community: IBM XL C, C++, and Fortran Compilers for Power servers

fortran compilers
IBM software